Bernard Bardin (2 August 1934 – 3 February 2023) was a French teacher and politician.

Biography
Born in Cervon on 2 August 1934, Bardin was a teacher at the Collège de Clamecy before becoming a parliamentary assistant to François Mitterrand.

Elected Mayor of Clamecy in 1977, he served in this role until 2008. During this term, he provided the commune with a multipurpose town hall, as well as cultural and sports facilities. The commune's museum was renovated and enlarged from 1996 to 2005.

From 1981 to 1993, Bardin was a deputy of the National Assembly, serving in Nièvre's 3rd constituency.

Bernard Bardin died on 3 February 2023, at the age of 88.

References

1934 births
2023 deaths
French schoolteachers
Deputies of the 7th National Assembly of the French Fifth Republic
Deputies of the 8th National Assembly of the French Fifth Republic
Deputies of the 9th National Assembly of the French Fifth Republic
Mayors of places in Bourgogne-Franche-Comté
Socialist Party (France) politicians
People from Nièvre